King of the Beach is the sixteenth studio album by British singer-songwriter Chris Rea, released in 2000. The singles released for the album were "All Summer Long" and "Who Do You Love". The album reached #26 in the UK. There was also a Japanese version with "Mississippi" and "There’s Only You" included as tracks.

The album, being a loose sequel to earlier On the Beach, was inspired by Rea's trip to Turks and Caicos Islands. A remix of "All Summer Long" was a dance hit in Ibiza and other Mediterranean places.

Track listing 
All songs by Chris Rea.
 "King of the Beach" – 5:00
 "All Summer Long" – 5:14
 "Sail Away" – 4:48
 "Still Beautiful" – 4:10
 "The Bones of Angels" – 4:15
 "Guitar Street" – 4:42
 "Who Do You Love" – 4:52
 "The Memory of a Good Friend" – 3:55
 "Sandwriting" – 5:08
 "Tamatave" – 5:17
 "God Gave Me an Angel" – 2:59
 "Waiting for a Blue Sky" – 5:02
 "Mississippi" – 4:29
 "There’s Only You" – 3:40
Track 13 is a bonus track on the UK edition of the album. Track 14 is a bonus track on the Japanese edition of the album.

Personnel 
 Chris Rea – vocals, keyboards, guitars, drum programming
 Max Middleton – acoustic piano (1, 3, 4, 7, 9, 12), Fender Rhodes (3, 4, 7, 9, 12)
 Pete Wingfield – Hammond organ (2, 3, 5, 6, 7, 10, 12)
 Robert Ahwai – guitars
 Sylvan Marc – bass
 Martin Ditcham – drums (1-9, 12, percussion (1, 4, 6)
 Julie Isaac – backing vocals (2, 5)
 Debbie Longworth – backing vocals (2, 5)

Production 
 Chris Rea – producer 
 Neil Amor – engineer
 Arun Chakraverty – mastering
 Tommy Willis – coordination
 John Knowles – management
 Peacock – design, illustrations
 John Miller – cover painting

Charts

References

2000 albums
Chris Rea albums
East West Records albums